The Nashville Division is a railroad division operated by CSX Transportation in the U.S. states of Alabama, Georgia, Kentucky, Illinois, Indiana, and Tennessee. The Nashville Division has fourteen subdivisions.

The subdivisions within the Nashville Division are as follows:
 Bruceton Subdivision
 CE&D Subdivision
 Chattanooga Subdivision
 Danville Secondary Subdivision
 Decatur Subdivision
 Evansville Terminal Subdivision
 Henderson Subdivision
 Memphis Subdivision
 Memphis Terminal Subdivision
 Nashville Subdivision
 Nashville Terminal Subdivision
 O&N Subdivision
 S&NA North Subdivision
 St. Louis Subdivision (Leased to EVWR)

See also
 List of CSX Transportation lines

References

CSX Transportation lines